On Friday, January 3, 1992, a Beechcraft 1900 operating CommutAir Flight 4821 crashed into a wooded hillside near Gabriels, New York while conducting an ILS approach to Runway 23 at the Adirondack Regional Airport. The cause of the accident was determined to be pilot error. There were two people killed in the crash, and two survivors.

Accident 
Flight 4821 was a regularly scheduled early morning USAir Express flight from Plattsburgh, New York, to Newark, New Jersey, with intermediate stops in Saranac Lake and Albany, New York. The crew for Flight 4281 were Captain Kevin St. Germain, 30, and First Officer Dean Montana, 23. There were two passengers on board, one of which was an off-duty CommutAir employee.

Shortly before the crash occurred, the aircraft had contacted CommutAir officials on the ground at Lake Clear Airport. During the descent into Saranac Lake, the crew descended below the glide slope and crashed into a hill at 5:45am. First Officer Montana and the company employee passenger were killed. Captain St. Germain and the other passenger survived the crash with injuries.

Investigation 
The aircraft was new and the crew was experienced. Immediately following the accident, there was no clear cause.

The aircraft was not required to be equipped with a flight data recorder (FDR), therefore, a flight data recorder was not present. The aircraft was equipped with a cockpit voice recorder (CVR) but it was burned to the point that the data inside were not usable. The National Transportation Safety Board (NTSB) used aircraft position data from air traffic control, the aircraft wreckage, survivor interviews, and weather information to find its probable cause.

The NTSB blamed the pilots for the crash. Captain St. Germain failed to stabilize the approach, cross check the instruments, and descended below the minimum altitude. First Officer Montana failed to monitor the approach. The contributing factors to the crash were weather and possible precipitation static interference, which could have caused unreliable glide slope indications.

References

Accidents and incidents involving the Beechcraft 1900
Aviation accidents and incidents in the United States in 1992
Airliner accidents and incidents in New York (state)
Airliner accidents and incidents caused by pilot error
1992 in New York (state)
January 1992 events in the United States